Leaves in the River is the full-length debut album by Sea Wolf, released on September 25, 2007.

Track listing
All songs by Alex Brown Church.

 "Leaves in the River" - 4:57
 "Winter Windows" - 3:51
 "Black Dirt" - 3:39
 "The Rose Captain" - 3:40
 "Middle Distance Runner" - 3:33
 "You're a Wolf" - 3:35
 "Song for the Dead" - 3:28
 "Black Leaf Falls" - 3:25
 "The Cold, the Dark and the Silence" - 4:28
 "Neutral Ground" - 3:55

External links
 Sea Wolf - Leaves In The River at Dangerbird Records
 Sea Wolf - Leaves In The River at AllMusic

2007 albums
Albums produced by Phil Ek
Dangerbird Records albums
Sea Wolf (band) albums